Kenyavelleda jirouxi is a species of beetle in the family Cerambycidae, and the only species in the genus Kenyavelleda. It was described by Téocchi in 1999.

References

Morimopsini
Beetles described in 1999